The tongue and lips logo or alternatively the lips and tongue logo, also known as the Hot Lips logo, or the Rolling Stones Records logo, or simply the Rolling Stones logo, is a logo designed by the English art designer John Pasche for the rock band The Rolling Stones in 1970. It has been called the most famous logo in the history of popular music. The logo has remained on all post-1970 albums and singles by the Rolling Stones, in addition to the band's merchandise (from t-shirts to fire lighters) and their stage sets.

History 

The Rolling Stones needed a poster for their 1970 European Tour, but they were unhappy with the designs that were offered to them by their then record company Decca Records. The band began to look for a design student to design not only the poster, but also a logo or symbol which could be used on note paper, a programme cover and a cover for the press book. John Pasche was in his third and final year at the time on his Master of Arts degree at the Royal College of Art in London 1970 when Mick Jagger approached him, having seen his designs at the final degree show. Having accepted the commission, Pasche started working on the poster. Jagger accepted his second and final version. 

For the logo, Jagger had suggested the tongue of the Hindu goddess Kali. Pasche said at the time, "The design concept for the tongue was to represent the band's anti-authoritarian attitude, Mick's mouth, and the obvious sexual connotations. I designed it in such a way that it was easily reproduced and in a style I thought could stand the test of time." In an interview with The New York Times, Pasche recalled that, “I didn’t want to do anything Indian, because I thought it would be very dated quickly, as everyone was going through that phase at the time”. However, it did inspire him to his design.

In New York, Craig Braun as the owner and creative director of the Sound Packaging Corporation, had a deadline to complete the artwork for the band's Sticky Fingers album and he needed the logo from Pasche. 

Illustrators at Craig Braun's Sound Packaging Corporation finished the logo by narrowing the tongue, adding more white around the lips and tongue, with black to highlight the throat, then blew it up to cover the entire inside sleeve of the American release of Sticky Fingers album. Pasche’s version was used internationally.

Pasche was paid just £50 in 1970 for the logo, he was paid a further £200 in 1972. In 1984 Pasche sold his copyright of the logo to the Rolling Stones' commercial arm, Musidor BV, for £26,000. In 2008, London's Victoria and Albert Museum (V&A) bought Pasche's original artwork of the Rolling Stones tongue and lips logo for $92,500. The Art Fund paid half towards the artwork at Chicago online auction house, Mastro Auctions. Victoria Broakes, head of exhibitions at the V&A said, “The Rolling Stones’ Tongue is one of the first examples of a group using branding and it has become arguably the world’s most famous rock logo,”

In 2012, the band commissioned Shepard Fairey to update the logo for their 50th anniversary. 

After the death of Charlie Watts in 2021, the logo was changed to black for the No Filter Tour in his memory.

Accolades

Sean Egan in his book The Mammoth Book of the Rolling Stones said of the logo, "Regardless of its provenance, the logo is superb. Without using the Stones' name, it instantly conjures them, or at least Jagger, as well as a certain lasciviousness that is the Stones' own... It quickly and deservedly became the most famous logo in the history of popular music."

Tailor Brands named the logo the Best Band Logo in History and the "most iconic band logo in all of rock history".

In 2020, Joobin Bekhrad of The New York Times wrote "It began life as a tiny emblem, something to adorn a 45 r.p.m. single or the band’s letterhead. It quickly became ubiquitous and, ultimately, the most famous logo in rock ’n’ roll. Over 50 years, the legendary “tongue and lips” of the Rolling Stones has been emblazoned on everything."

Creative Review compiled a list of the top commercial logos of all time, with the tongue and lips logo coming in 15th position.

The Sticky Fingers album was the first to feature the logo on the record label for Rolling Stones Records and on the inside cover. The logo was part of a package that, in 2003, VH1 named the "No. 1 Greatest Album Cover" of all time.

Usage and merchandise

The use of the logo has gone far beyond its original use on an album cover, record label and a tour poster, it has become the band's logo. It is now used widely on most of the Rolling Stones' merchandise, including t-shirts, sweatshirts, socks, coasters, luggage tags, whisky flasks, belts, baseball caps, credit cards etc. The logo has even been used on the band's aircraft for their concerts tours. The logo has been used on all post-1970 Rolling Stones releases, both on Rolling Stones Records since 1970 and when the band signed to Virgin Records. In 2022, the logo was created in LEGO for the LEGO Art theme, as part of the band's 60th anniversary.

References

External links
 

British logos
The Rolling Stones
Hinduism in popular culture
Lips
Tongue